This is a list of the most important tourist sites in Cluj-Napoca, Romania.

Historical places

Places of worship 

 Bob Church
 Calvaria Church
 Church on the Hill
 Evangelical Church
 Franciscan Church
 Greek Catholic Cathedral in Cipariu Square (under construction)
 Metropolitan Cathedral
 Minorites' Church
 Neolog Synagogue
 Piarists' Church
 Ss. Peter and Paul Church
 St. Michael's Church
 Unitarian Church
 Reformed Church on Wolves' Street (today Kogălniceanu Street)

Historical buildings 

 Babos Palace
 Bánffy Palace
 Beldi Palace
 Benkő House
 Berde Palace
 Biasini Hotel
 City Hall
 Convictus Nobilium
 Elian Palace
 Filstich-Kemény House
 Firemen's Tower
 Heltai House
 Hintz House
 Jósika Palace
 Kovary House
 Master's House
 Matthias Corvinus House
 Mikes Palace
 Mint House
 New York Hotel (also known as Continental Hotel)
 Orthodox Archbishopric Palace
 Palace of Finance
 Palace of Justice
 Petrechevich-Horvath House
 Piuariu-Molnar House
 Postal Palace
 Prefecture Palace
 Reduta Palace
 Regional Railway Palace
 Rhédey Palace
 Széki Palace
 Tailors' Bastion
 Teleki Palace
 Telephone Palace
 Toldalagi-Korda Palace
 Tranzit House (former Poalei Tzedek Synagogue)
 Urania Palace
 Wass Palace
 Wolphard-Kakas House

Statues and historical monuments 
 Carolina Obelisk
 Cross on the Cetățuie
 Horea, Cloșca and Crișan Statuary Group
 Lupa Capitolina
 Matthias Corvinus Monumental Ensemble
 ”Shot Pillars” Monument
 Școala Ardeleană Statuary Group
 Statue of Avram Iancu
 Statue of Baba Novac
 Statue of St. George
 Virgin Mary Statue

Cultural buildings 

 Lucian Blaga National Theater
 Hungarian Theatre of Cluj
 Romanian National Opera in Cluj-Napoca
 Cluj-Napoca Hungarian Opera
 Transylvania State Philharmonic Orchestra

Museums 
 Albert Györkös Mányi Memorial House
 Art Museum
 Ethnographic Museum of Transylvania
 National Museum of Transylvanian History
 Pharmacy Museum
 Museums of the Babeș-Bolyai University:
 Aquarium
 Botanical Museum
 Emil Racoviță Museum of Speleology
 History Museum of the University
 Museum of Mineralogy
 Museum of Paleontology and Stratigraphy
 Vivarium
 Zoological Museum

Malls and shopping centers 

 Iulius Mall Cluj
 VIVO! Cluj-Napoca
 Central
 Cora
 Sigma Shopping Center
 Sora Shopping Center
 Winmarkt

Gardens, parks and forests 

 Alexandru Borza Botanical Garden
 Cetățuia Park
 Colina Park
 Hoia Forest
 Iuliu Hațieganu Sports Park
 Iuliu Prodan Park
 Mercur Park
 Park of the Railwaymen
 Romulus Vuia Ethnographic Park
 Roses Park
 Simion Bărnuțiu Central Park

Squares 
 Avram Iancu Square
 Stephen the Great Square
 Union Square

Cemeteries 
 Hajongard Cemetery
 Israelite Cemetery
 Mănăștur Cemetery

Venues 

 Cluj Arena
 Polyvalent Hall

Places in Cluj-Napoca